Patrick Lane (born 28 August 1991 in Carlton) is an Australian cyclist riding for Avanti IsoWhey Sports.

Major results
2010
1st Stage 3 Tour of Geelong
2011
1st Stage 5 Giro del Friuli Venezia Giulia
2nd Overall Tour of Wellington
3rd Trofeo Città di San Vendemiano
2015
3rd Overall National Capital Tour
2016
1st Grafton to Inverell Classic
3rd National Road Race Championships

References

1991 births
Living people
Australian male cyclists